Christmas with Nora Aunor is the first Christmas album released  by Filipino singer-actress Nora Aunor, in 1970 released by Alpha Records Corporation in the Philippines in LP format and later released  in a compilation/ cd format.  The album contains some of the most famous traditional Christmas Carols

Background
The album is one of Aunor's best-selling albums, which was re-arranged to complement the voice of Nora Aunor.

Track listing

Side one

Side two

References

See also
 Nora Aunor discography

Nora Aunor albums
1970 Christmas albums
Christmas albums by Filipino artists
Pop Christmas albums